Naturalism is a movement in European drama and theatre that developed in the late 19th and early 20th centuries. It refers to theatre that attempts to create an illusion of reality through a range of dramatic and theatrical strategies. Interest in naturalism especially flourished with the French playwrights of the time, but the most successful example is Strindberg's play Miss Julie, which was written with the intention to abide by both his own particular version of naturalism, and also the version described by the French novelist and literary theoretician, Emile Zola.

Zola's term for naturalism is la nouvelle formule.  The three primary principles of naturalism (faire vrai, faire grand and faire simple) are first, that the play should be realistic, and the result of a careful study of human behaviour and psychology.  The characters should be flesh and blood; their motivations and actions should be grounded in their heredity and environment.  The presentation of a naturalistic play, in terms of the setting and performances, should be realistic and not flamboyant or theatrical.  The single setting of Miss Julie, for example, is a kitchen.  Second, the conflicts in the play should be issues of meaningful, life-altering significance — not small or petty.  And third, the play should be simple — not cluttered with complicated sub-plots or lengthy expositions.

Darwinism pervades naturalistic plays, especially in the determining role of the environment on character, and as motivation for behavior.  Naturalism emphasizes everyday speech forms; plausibility in the writing (no ghosts, spirits or gods intervening in the human action); a choice of subjects that are contemporary and reasonable (no exotic, otherworldly or fantastic locales, nor historical or mythic time-periods); an extension of the social range of characters portrayed (not only the aristocrats of classical drama but also bourgeois and working-class protagonists) and social conflicts; and a style of acting that attempts to recreate the impression of reality.

Naturalism was first advocated explicitly by Émile Zola in his 1880 essay entitled Naturalism on the Stage.

Influences 
Naturalistic writers were influenced by the theory of evolution of Charles Darwin. They believed that one's heredity and social environment determine one's character. Whereas realism seeks only to describe subjects as they really are, naturalism also attempts to determine "scientifically" the underlying forces (i.e. the environment or heredity) influencing the actions of its subjects. Naturalistic works are opposed to romanticism, in which subjects may receive highly symbolic, idealistic, or even supernatural treatment. They often include uncouth or sordid subject matter; for example, Émile Zola's works had a frankness about sexuality along with a pervasive pessimism. Naturalistic works exposed the dark harshness of life, including poverty, racism, sex, prejudice, disease, prostitution, and filth. As a result, Naturalistic writers were frequently criticized for being too blunt.

Plays of naturalism
 Woyzeck (1837) by Georg Büchner - considered a forerunner to Naturalism
 A Bitter Fate (1859) by Aleksey Pisemsky
 The Power of Darkness (1886) by Leo Tolstoy
 The Father (1887) by August Strindberg
 Miss Julie (1888) by August Strindberg
 Creditors (1889) by August Strindberg
 The Weavers (1892) by Gerhart Hauptmann
 Drayman Henschel (1898) by Gerhart Hauptmann
 Uncle Vanya (1898) by Anton Chekhov
 The Cherry Orchard (1904) by Anton Chekhov
A Doll’s House (1879) by Henrik Ibsen

See also 
 Naturalism (art)
 Naturalism (literature)
 Philosophical naturalism
 Sociological naturalism
 Realism in the arts
 Realism in theatre
kitchen sink Drama

Notes

Further reading

 Banham, Martin, ed. 1998. The Cambridge Guide to Theatre. Cambridge: Cambridge University Press. .
 Counsell, Colin. 1996. Signs of Performance: An Introduction to Twentieth-Century Theatre. London and New York: Routledge. .
 Hagen, Uta. 1973. Respect for Acting. New York: Macmillan. .
 Hall, Peter. 2004. Shakespeare's Advice to the Players. London: Oberon. .
 Kolocotroni, Vassiliki, Jane Goldman and Olga Taxidou, eds. 1998. Modernism: An Anthology of Sources and Documents. Edinburgh: Edinburgh University Press. .
 Rodenberg, Patsy. 2002. Speaking Shakespeare. London: Methuen. .
 Stanislavski, Konstantin. 1936. An Actor Prepares. London: Methuen, 1988. .
 Weimann, Robert. 1978. Shakespeare and the Popular Tradition in the Theater: Studies in the Social Dimension of Dramatic Form and Function. Baltimore and London: The Johns Hopkins University Press. .
 Williams, Raymond. 1976. Keywords: A Vocabulary of Culture and Society. London: Fontana, 1988. .
 ---. 1989. The Politics of Modernism: Against the New Conformists. Ed. Tony Pinkney. London and New York: Verso. .
 ---. 1993. Drama from Ibsen to Brecht. London: Hogarth. .

19th-century theatre
Literary movements
Realism (art movement)
Theatre